Special Raider Infantry Battalion 744 or 744th Special Raider Infantry Battalion (Indonesian: Yonif Raider Khusus 744/Satya Yudha Bhakti) is a territorial Infantry battalion of the Indonesian Army. It used to be part of 21st Special Raider Infantry Brigade/Komodo Kodam IX/Udayana when East Timor was still part of Indonesia. Established on January 24, 1978, this battalion was headquartered in Los Palos, East Timor now Timor-Leste.

One of the accomplishments of this battalion was participation in the ambush that killed the President of Fretilin, Nicolau Lobato in January 1979. The raid was conducted jointly with Kopassus troops under the command of future Minister of Defense Prabowo Subianto.

Once out of the Unitary Republic of Indonesia over East Timor, the Battalion and its achievements recorded in operation to the Security Pengacau Movement (GPK) East Timor, its existence is maintained by the (then) Commander of the 9th Military Region Maj. Gen. Kiki Syahnarki. Among its past commanders was a future President of Indonesia, Susilo Bambang Yudhoyono, who served as commanding officer from 1986 to 1988.

Although the 164th Military Area/Wiradharma in East Timor was dissolved along with the loss of East Timor from the Republic of Indonesia, the Battalion was maintained and eventually became part of the 161st Military Area Command/Wirasakti's organic forces at Kupang. Today, it serves as part of the 22nd Infantry Brigade (raised 2009) and is one of the currently 43 Army Raider Infantry Battalions.

Ambush of Nicolau Lobato 
744 Infantry Battalion (Yonif 744) then led by Major Yunus Yosfiah was in pursuit of the Fretilin forces in Maubisse Kecil for almost two weeks. Troops involved were the 744th, 700th, and 401st Infantry battalions together with Team-28 from Kopassus.

On December 30, 1978 at 05.00 the Commander of the Nanggala-28 team, Capt. Inf Danyon Prabowo reported to the 744th commander Major Yunus Yosfiah of the Fretilin troop movements toward the south. Central Sector Commander, Infantry Colonel Tottori Sahala King immediately ordered a siege against the target. Formation of the TNI troops at that time were:
 Team Nanggala-28 (Kopassus): North side
 700th and 401st Infantry battalions: East side
 744th Infantry battalions: as the spearhead of the attack
On that day I Platoon Company B, led the 744th Yonif Maudobe Sergeant involved in the gunfire resulted in a number of enemy casualty. Among the dead was Sergeant Maudobe and Nicolau Lobato. The body was successfully recognized by Gutteres two Soldiers (enlisted radio bearer). The pursuit also involved helicopter units.

Further reading
The Australian, Final Parade for Dili Killers; Era of Indonesian Army Infamy has Ended, 2000
Digest of West Timor Press, March 31-April 1, 2000, listing amongst others disbandment of 744's sister battalion 745

Battalions of Indonesia
Military of Indonesia 
Indonesian Army
Military units and formations established in 1978